Nelle Nugent (born 1939) is an American independent Broadway producer.

Biography
She was born May 24, 1939, in Jersey City. She has overseen productions such as Amadeus, Morning's at Seven, The Elephant Man, The Life and Adventures of Nicholas Nickleby, and Dracula, and awards she has won includes Tony for all five listed shows.

In 1982 she began her third marriage, to Jolyon Fox Stern, president of a New York insurance brokerage.

She and producer John Schwally started the east coast chapter of the Producers Guild of America in 2001, and  she is one of its five members-at-large.

 she will be a co-producer with musician Alicia Keys and Reuben Cannon for Lydia Diamond's Stick Fly at the Cort Theatre on Broadway beginning November 18, 2011.

References

External links

McCann & Nugent Productions records, 1976-1986, held by the Billy Rose Theatre Division, New York Public Library for the Performing Arts

Nugent,Nelle
Nugent,Nelle
Nugent,Nelle
1939 births
Living people
21st-century American women